Imokilly Regato is a cows' milk hard cheese made in Mogeely, County Cork, Ireland.

History
The cheese takes its name from Imokilly, an ancient barony in Ireland, now a region in the east of County Cork. It is made from pasteurised milk by the Imokilly Cheese Company, part of the Dairygold cooperative, at its Mogeely specialty cheese facility. The cheese was granted Protected Designation of Origin (PDO) status under European Union law in  1999.

See also
 Irish cuisine
 List of Irish cheeses
 List of Republic of Ireland food and drink products with protected status

References

External links
Dairygold: Imokilly Regato PDO
Publication of an application for registration pursuant to Article 6(2) of Regulation (EEC) No 2081/92 on the protection of geographical indications and designations of origin (98/C 343/04)
Irish Examiner: Only four Irish foods make it on to EU quality list
Cheeses of the World: Imokilly Regato

Irish cuisine
Irish cheeses
Cow's-milk cheeses
Irish products with protected designation of origin